Vestbjerg is a town and satellite community just outside Aalborg, Denmark. Vestbjerg has a population of 2,888 (1 January 2022).

References

Cities and towns in the North Jutland Region
Towns and settlements in Aalborg Municipality